Valkenier or Valkeniers is a surname. Notable people by that name include:

 Elizabeth Kridl Valkenier (born 1926) is a Polish-American art historian.
 Bruno Valkeniers (born 1955) is a Flemish businessman.
 Jef Valkeniers (born 1932) is a physician-neuropsychiatrist and a Flemish politician.